Trachischium sushantai,  Sushanta's worm-eating snake,  is a species of colubrid snake, which is endemic to India.

References

Trachischium
Reptiles described in 2018
Reptiles of India